This was the first edition of the tournament. 

James Cluskey and Fabrice Martin won the final 3–6, 6–3, [10–5] against Brydan Klein and Ruan Roelofse.

Seeds

Draw

Draw

References
 Main Draw

PTT Cup - Doubles
2013 - Doubles